Mehmet Günsür (born 8 May 1975) is a Turkish model, actor and producer.

Early life 
Günsür was born in 1975 as the second child of a family of Tatar descent (a Turkic ethnic subgroup). His mother, Sibel, was a lecturer and his father, Teoman, was an industrial engineer who graduated from the Middle East Technical University and worked in a number of different sectors. His older sister Zeynep Günsür Yüceil, who is a choreographer of modern ballet, is also a lecturer.

Career 
He began his acting career at the age of seven in various commercials. At the age of 14, he appeared in Okan Uysaler's Past Spring Mimoses with actors such as Rutkay Aziz, Filiz Akın and Müşfik Kenter. After graduating from the Italian High School, he entered the Marmara University Communication Faculty and graduated with honors. Günsür gave concerts with a music group and ran a restaurant for four years. With a friend's help, he auditioned for a role in the movie Hamam. After the trial shot, he was accepted for the role and the film was directed by Ferzan Özpetek. After this film, he decided to turn to acting.

Günsür got married on 17 July 2006 to the Italian documentalist Caterina Mongio, whom he met in 2004. They have 3 children.

Filmography

References

External links
 
 Official Twitter page

1975 births
Male actors from Istanbul
Living people
Turkish male film actors
Turkish male child actors
Turkish people of Tatar descent
Turkish male models
Turkish expatriates in Italy
Liceo Italiano alumni